Reijin was a Panamanian car carrier that capsized off Porto, Portugal, in April 1988 on her maiden voyage. The ship was later scuttled in deep water despite the protests of ecologists.

Description
Reijin was built as yard number 2535 in 1987 by the Shin Kurushima Dockyard Co, Imabari, Ehime Prefecture, Japan. The ship was powered by a diesel engine driving a single screw propeller.

History
Reijin was launched on 19 December 1987. She was built for Nissan Prince Kaiun. She was operated by Emerald Shipholding. Her port of registry was Panama City. The IMO Number 8708842 was allocated. On 26 April 1988, she ran aground and capsized off Porto, Portugal. One crew member was killed. She was carrying a cargo of 5,432 new cars. Reijin was on her maiden voyage, from Japan to Ireland.

Although the dumping of the cars was started, it was not completed as such action was in violation of the London Dumping Convention, due to the plastics contained in the cars. Reijin was sunk in deep water.

References

See also
List of roll-on/roll-off vessel accidents

1987 ships
Ships built in Japan
Merchant ships of Panama
Maritime incidents in 1988
Shipwrecks in the Atlantic Ocean
1988 in Portugal